Asuel Castle is a ruined castle near Asuel, in the municipality of La Baroche of the Canton of Jura in Switzerland.  It is a Swiss heritage site of national significance.

See also
 List of castles in Switzerland

References

Cultural property of national significance in the canton of Jura
Castles in the canton of Jura
Ruined castles in Switzerland